The Final Hour is a 1936 American drama film directed by D. Ross Lederman.

Cast
 Ralph Bellamy as John Henry Vickery
 Marguerite Churchill as Florence Russell
 John Gallaudet as Redd McLarnen
 George McKay as Charlie
 Elisabeth Risdon as Fortune Teller
 Marc Lawrence as Mike Magellon
 Lina Basquette as Belle

References

External links
 

1936 films
1936 drama films
American drama films
1930s English-language films
American black-and-white films
Films directed by D. Ross Lederman
Columbia Pictures films
1930s American films